Dzmitry Huletski (Гулецкий (rus.), Huletzky (germ.)) (born 29 March 1981) – independent Belarusian numismatic and antiquities researcher and publisher.

 2005–2018 – Delegate of Belarus at numismatic conferences in Raubichi, Minsk (Belarus), Białystok (Poland), Moscow (Russia) and Vilnius (Lithuania)
 2006–2018 – Numismatic publications in Bank informer magazine (Minsk, Belarus), Svensk Numismatisk Tidskrift magazine (Stockholm, Sweden), Bialoruskie Zeszyty Historyczne magazine (Białystok, Poland), Numizmatika (Vilnius, Lithuania) and other.
 2008–2011 – Thematic articles in newspapers Bielarus (New York City, United States), "Soviet Belarus" (Minsk, Belarus)

Founder and the chief editor of the research series "Rus', Lithuania, Horde in artifacts of numismatics and sigillography" (Minsk-Moscow, since 2015). Awarded the gold mark of the Belarusian Numismatic Society (2017).

Books 
2007 – Book Coins of Belarus until 1707 (co-authorship, organization, foundation). Belarusian language. English summary
2007 – Book Historical coins in Belarus (authorship). Belarusian language
2008 – Book Collectable Heritage of the Grand Duchy of Lithuania (co-authorship, organization, foundation). Belarusian language.
2011 – Russian Wire Coins 1533–1645 guide book (authorship, organization, foundation). English language. English summary 
2013 – "Russian Coins 1353–1533" (co-authored by K. Petrunin) (Rus.)
2014 – "Collectioner" (as co-author and editor) (Belarus.)
2015 – "Coins of Grand-Duchy of Lithuania 2nd half 14@th century to 1536" (Rus. & Eng.)
2015 – "100 most famous russian coins" (Rus.)
2015 – "100 most famous world coins" (Rus.)
2015 – "Early Russian Coins 1353–1533" (co-authored by K. Petrunin, A. Fishman) (Eng.)
2016 – "Coins of the Golden Horde: Period of the Great Mongols (1224–1266)» (with J. Farr)
2016 – "Early Russian Coins 930–1492 and their values" (vol. 1)
2017 – "Russian Medieval Coins" (with K. Petrunin)
2017 – "Early Lithuanian half-groats 1495–1529" (with G. Bagdonas and N. Doroshkevich)
2017 – "All the coins of Russia from ancient to modern times»
2018 – "Fur Money of Medieval Russia (11–13 cts)" (with N. Doroshkevich)

References 

Belarusian numismatists
1981 births
Living people